This is a list of NASCAR drivers who live in Latin-American countries or are Hispanic and Latino Americans that have raced in one of its national or touring series, excluding the NASCAR Mexico Series.

Active drivers from Hispanic countries
All statistics in this table are as of the end of the 2022 season.

Active drivers who are Hispanic-American
All statistics in this table are as of the end of the 2022 season.

Non-active drivers from Latin-American countries

Non-active drivers from territories of the United States

See also
 List of NASCAR drivers
 List of female NASCAR drivers
 List of African-American NASCAR drivers
 List of Canadian NASCAR drivers

References

Hispanic
NASCAR drivers,Hispanic